Giovanni Battista del Giudice (died 1542) was a Roman Catholic prelate who served as Bishop of Vulturara e Montecorvino (1537–1542).

Biography
On 23 Jul 1537, Giovanni Battista del Giudice was appointed during the papacy of Pope Paul III as Bishop of Vulturara e Montecorvino. He served as Bishop of Vulturara e Montecorvino until his death in 1542.

References

External links and additional sources 
 (for Chronology of Bishops) 
 (for Chronology of Bishops) 

16th-century Italian Roman Catholic bishops
1542 deaths
Bishops appointed by Pope Paul III